The term downtime is used to refer to periods when a system is unavailable.

Downtime or Down Time may also refer to:

 Downtime (break), a period of rest and relaxation, especially during a day of labour
 Downtime, a 1986 film directed by Greg Hanec and produced by the Winnipeg Film Group
 Downtime (Doctor Who), a 1995 direct-to-video spin-off of the TV series Doctor Who
 Downtime (film), a 1997 British film
 "Downtime" (song), a 2001 single by Jo Dee Messina
 "Down Time", a 2006 single by Aaradhna
 "Downtime", a 2009 song by Timothy B. Schmit from his album Expando
 Down Time, a Turbo Drop ride at Lake Compounce amusement park, Bristol, Connecticut
 Uptime / Downtime, a 2010 double album by the Kleptones
 A Mnemonic for the seven wastes of Muda (Japanese term)
 Down Time, a 2013 zine by American artist Jeremy Bolm